The Men's Allam British Open 2014 is the men's edition of the 2014 British Open Squash Championships, which is a PSA World Series event Platinum (Prize money : 150,000 $). The event took place at the Sports Arena in Hull in England from 12 May to 20 May. Grégory Gaultier won his second British Open trophy, beating Nick Matthew in the final.

Prize money and ranking points
For 2014, the prize purse was $150,000. The prize money and points breakdown is as follows:

Seeds

Draw and results

See also
2014 Men's World Open Squash Championship
2014 Women's British Open Squash Championship

References

External links
PSA British Open 2014 website
British Open 2014 official website

Men's British Open Squash Championships
Men's British Open
Men's British Open
Men's British Open
Squash in England
Men's sport in the United Kingdom
Sport in Kingston upon Hull
2010s in Kingston upon Hull